Hot Money is a 1936 American comedy film directed by William C. McGann and written by William Jacobs. The film stars Ross Alexander, Beverly Roberts, Joseph Cawthorn, Paul Graetz, Andrew Tombes and Cy Kendall. The film was released by Warner Bros. on July 18, 1936. It was based on the play of the same name by Aben Kandel who also co-wrote the screenplay. The story was used twice before in films as High Pressure (1932) and a French speaking version in the same year Le bluffeur.

Plot
A possibly crazy scientist has apparently invented a formula that can turn water into gasoline. Despite his reluctance, businessman Dourfuss is convinced by con artist Willie to provide seed money. Willie then recruits his pal, fast-talking sharpie Chick Randall, to seek out investors and help sell the product to the public. Chick hires a bunch of derelicts with names like Vanderbilt and Ford to act as the board of directors, as well as a pretty stenographer, Grace Lane. She initially thinks the whole thing is a scam, but a demonstration convinces her it's on the level; in time, they fall in love. But things take an ugly turn when the initial supply runs out and the scientist has disappeared.

Cast        
 Ross Alexander as Chick Randall
 Beverly Roberts as Grace Lane
 Joseph Cawthorn as Max Dourfuss
 Paul Graetz as Dr. David
 Andrew Tombes as Willie
 Frank Orth as Hank Ford
 Cy Kendall as Joe Morgan
 George Beranger as Ed Biddle
 Joe Cunningham as Gus Vanderbilt
 Anne Nagel as Ruth McElniney
 Eddie Conrad as Antonio Romenetti 
 Harry Burns as Pasquale Romenetti
 Addison Richards as Forbes
 Charley Foy as Ratto 
 Robert Emmett Keane as Professor Kimberly 
 Edwin Stanley as Joe Thomas

Reception
T.M.P. of The New York Times said, "Patterned somewhat along the lines of Get Rich Quick Wallingford, the new film is neither particularly good nor conspicuously poor farce. Thanks to competent editing and direction, it falls quite gracefully into that niche reserved for "amiable entertainments."

References

External links 
 
 
 
 

1936 films
Warner Bros. films
American comedy films
1936 comedy films
Films directed by William C. McGann
American black-and-white films
American films based on plays
1930s English-language films
1930s American films